Alice (also known as Per Elisa) is the fourth studio album by Italian singer-songwriter Alice, released in 1981 on EMI Music.

The album includes Alice's winning entry in the 1981 Sanremo Music Festival, "Per Elisa", and the Alice album was released under that title in certain territories, then also with alternative cover art. The track "Una notte speciale" was released as the follow-up single to "Per Elisa".

An alternate version of "Una notte speciale" appears on the 1987 album Elisir. A re-recorded version of "Per Elisa" was included in the 2000 career retrospective Personal Jukebox.

Track listing
Side A
"Per Elisa" (Franco Battiato, Giusto Pio, Alice) – 3:40
"A Te..." (Alice) – 4:56
"Non ti confondere amico" (Alice) – 4:25
"Una notte speciale" (Alice, Franco Battiato, Giusto Pio) – 4:14

Side B
"Non devi aver paura" (Alice) – 3:42
"Senza cornice" (Alice) – 5:30
"Momenti d'ozio" (Alice, Franco Battiato, Giusto Pio) – 3:18
"Tramonto urbano" (Alice) – 3:16

Personnel
 Alice – lead vocals
 Walter Calloni – drums
 Flaviano Cuffari – drums tracks A1, B1, B3
 Paolo Donnarumma – bass guitar
 Alberto Radius – guitar
 Filippo Destrieri – keyboard instruments, Fender Rhodes, synth
 Salvatore Giumeno – clarinet
 Franco Tangari – oboe
 Hugo Heredia – saxophone
 Paola Orlandi – backing vocals track A4

Production
 Angelo Carrara – record producer
 Franco Battiato – musical arranger
 Giusto Pio – musical arranger
 Enzo "Titti" Denna – sound engineer
 Recorded and mixed at Radius Studio
 Luciano Tallarini – graphic design
 Fulvio Ventura – photography
 Francesco Messina – art direction

Charts

Weekly charts

Year-end charts

References

External links

1981 albums
Alice (singer) albums
EMI Records albums
Italian-language albums